Viciano or Station Viciano was a Roman road station (mansio type)  of unclear location, somewhere in Kosovo field.

History 
Viciana was a stopping place for caravans that travelled the Lissus–Naissus route, one of the most important Roman roads. The route started from Lezha (Lissus) on the Adriatic coast, went through the Drin river valley, crossed through Dardania, and continued to Niš (Naissus).

The location is undetermined. It has been theorized to have been somewhere in the Kosovo field, in the vicinity of Vushtrri (Vučitrn) or Zvečan (J. Dragašević), the village of Čaglavica (Z. Mirdita).

Viciano as a road station is recorded in the Tabula Peuntingeriana map, a medieval (15th century) map and copy of a 3rd-century Roman map showing this same itinerary. The road once passed near the ancient center of Municipium Ulpiana which connected it to other Roman towns, particularly mining centers rich in precious minerals.

See also 
 List of monuments in Vushtrri

References

Sources

Further reading 
Exhlale Dobruna-Salihu, «Problem of the location of the station Viciano», Materijali arheoloskog dru$tva Jugoslavije, xvii, 1978 [publ. 1980], pp. 163–167. 15529.
Zef Mirdita, «Probleme de la reconstruction du tracé de la route Vicianum-Gabu- ...

Dardanians
Illyrian Kosovo
Archaeology of Illyria
Moesia
Archaeology of Kosovo
Dardania (Roman province)
Roman towns and cities in Kosovo
Archaeological sites in Kosovo